Romani Studies is a biannual peer-reviewed academic journal covering all aspects of Romani/Gypsy studies. It is the official journal of the Gypsy Lore Society. It was established in 1888 and until 1982 was published as the Journal of the Gypsy Lore Society. Its publication resumed in 1991 and in 2000 the journal obtained its current title. The society currently publishes it in association with the Liverpool University Press.

Abstracting and indexing
The journal is abstracted and indexed in:

According to the Journal Citation Reports, the journal has a 2021 impact factor of 0.111.

Editors-in-chief
The following persons are or have been editor-in-chief:
Elena Marushiakova (current)
Colin Clark (2019–present)
Daniel Škobla (2019–2020)
Kimmo Granqvist (2017–2019)
Yaron Matras (1999–2017)
Sheila Salo (1990–1999)

References

External links

Publications established in 1888
1988 establishments in the United Kingdom
Romani studies
University of Liverpool
Biannual journals
English-language journals
Area studies journals